William Kipling "Kip" Hladky (born May 15, 1960) is a former field hockey player from Canada, who participated in the 1984 Summer Olympics in Los Angeles, California. There he finished in tenth place with the Men's National Team. He was born in Edmonton, Alberta, Canada.

International senior competitions

 1984 – Olympic Games, Los Angeles (10th)
 1986 Men's Hockey World Cup, London (10th)

References
Kip Hladky's profile at the Canadian Olympic Committee
Kip Hladky's profile at Sports Reference.com

External links
 

1960 births
Living people
Canadian male field hockey players
Canadian people of Czech descent
Field hockey players at the 1984 Summer Olympics
Olympic field hockey players of Canada
Sportspeople from Edmonton
Pan American Games medalists in field hockey
Pan American Games gold medalists for Canada
Field hockey players at the 1983 Pan American Games
Medalists at the 1983 Pan American Games